Tërnavicë, is a village near Podujevo, Kosovo.

Places of interest 
 There is a large free standing rock.

Events 
 A church existed until the local Serbian population migrated in 1878.

Notes and references 

Notes:

References:

Villages in Podujevo